The 2022 WAFF U-23 Championship is an international football tournament held in Saudi Arabia from 3 to 15 November 2022. It is the third edition of the U-23 age group competition organised by the West Asian Football Federation. 

The six national teams involved in the tournament were required to register a squad of at most 23 players, including three goalkeepers. Only players in these squads were eligible to take part in the tournament. Players born on or after 1 January 1999 were eligible to compete in the tournament.

The full squad listings are below. The age listed for each player is on 3 November 2022, the first day of the tournament. The nationality for each club reflects the national association (not the league) to which the club is affiliated. A flag is included for coaches who are of a different nationality than their own national team. Players in boldface were capped at full international level prior to being called up.

Group A

Lebanon 
Coach: Youssef Al-Jawhari

The squad was announced on 31 October 2022.

Oman 
Coach: Akram Habrish

The squad was announced on 28 October 2022.

Qatar 
Coach:  Bruno Pinheiro

The squad was announced on 16 October 2022.

Group B

Bahrain 
Coach:  Dario Bašić

The squad was announced on 31 October 2022.

Saudi Arabia 
Coach: Saad Al-Shehri

The squad was announced on 1 November 2022.

Syria 
Coach:  Mark Wotte

The squad was announced on 25 October 2022.

References

WAFF Championship
Football in the Arab world
International association football competitions in the Middle East by host
International association football competitions in Asia by host